Septem verba a Christo in cruce moriente prolata is a cycle of Good Friday cantatas, based upon Christ's words on the cross attributed to Pergolesi.

References

1736 compositions
Compositions by Giovanni Battista Pergolesi